Edmonton-Norwood was a provincial electoral district in Alberta, Canada, mandated to return a single member to the Legislative Assembly of Alberta using the first past the post method of voting from 1959 to 2004.

History
The Edmonton-Norwood electoral district was created from the Edmonton district in 1959 and was abolished in 2004 when it merged with Edmonton-Highlands to form Edmonton-Highlands-Norwood. The district was a swing riding and was held by every major party in Alberta. The district has seen a couple of floor crossings and was the only urban seat held by the Alberta Alliance Party.

In 2004 Gary Masyk ran a vigorous campaign to save the district from being abolished, and to reduce the effect of Edmonton losing seats to Calgary.

Members of the Legislative Assembly (MLAs)

Election results

1959 general election

1963 general election

1967 general election

1971 general election

1975 general election

1979 general election

1982 general election

1986 general election

1989 general election

1993 general election

1997 general election

2001 general election

Floor Crossings
Andrew Beniuk removed from the Liberal Caucus and sits as an Independent June 23, 1995.
Andrew Beniuk joins the Progressive Conservative Caucus 1996
Gary Masyk crosses the floor to the Alberta Alliance Party June 29, 2004.

See also
List of Alberta provincial electoral districts

References

Further reading

External links
Elections Alberta
The Legislative Assembly of Alberta

Former provincial electoral districts of Alberta
Politics of Edmonton